Ceaușescu or Ceausescu likely derives from the Turkish word Çavuş, meaning "messenger" or the military rank of sergeant in the Ottoman and Turkish armies. In modern usage, it most often refers to Nicolae Ceaușescu, the last Communist leader of Romania, but it may also refer to:

 Elena Ceaușescu, wife of Nicolae Ceaușescu
 Valentin Ceaușescu, Nicolae Ceaușescu's older son
 Zoia Ceaușescu, Nicolae Ceaușescu's daughter
 Nicu Ceaușescu, Nicolae Ceaușescu's younger son
 Marin Ceaușescu, Nicolae Ceaușescu's older brother
 Ilie Ceaușescu, Nicolae Ceaușescu's younger brother

The Ceaușescu family included a number of other less prominent individuals who are described on that page.

See also 
 Çavuş
 Ceaușu (disambiguation)

Note
The form Çauşescu—spelled with a cedilla—is considered inaccurate. No such letter exists in the Romanian alphabet.

References

Romanian-language surnames